

See also 
 Connecticut's at-large congressional district special election, 1805
 United States House of Representatives elections, 1804 and 1805
 List of United States representatives from Connecticut

1804
Connecticut
United States House of Representatives